Joseph Rosaire Wilfrid Paiement (born August 12, 1945) is a Canadian former professional ice hockey forward. He is the older brother of Wilf Paiement.

Paiement started his National Hockey League career with the Philadelphia Flyers in 1967. He also played for the Vancouver Canucks. He left the NHL after the 1972 season to play in the World Hockey Association.  There, he played for the Chicago Cougars, New England Whalers, and Indianapolis Racers. He now lives in the Fort Lauderdale area and is part owner of Jester's Bar & Grill, a local sports bar.

Career statistics

Regular season and playoffs

External links
 

1945 births
Canadian ice hockey centres
Chicago Cougars players
Franco-Ontarian people
Ice hockey people from Ontario
Indianapolis Racers players
Jersey Devils players
Living people
New England Whalers players
Niagara Falls Flyers players
People from Timiskaming District
Philadelphia Flyers players
Quebec Aces (AHL) players
Vancouver Canucks players